Play What You Feel is a live album by saxophonist Clifford Jordan's Big Band which was recorded in New York City in 1990 and released on the Mapleshade label in 1997.

Reception

The AllMusic review by Scott Yanow observed: "In 1990, tenor-saxophonist Clifford Jordan achieved one of his lifetime goals and formed a big band. They recorded a demo in December, 1990, that helped land them a record deal ... The music on Play What You Feel, which was originally the demo, was released for the first time in 1997. The 16-piece orchestra, which includes many of Jordan's friends and longtime associates, was loose but tight, featuring strong solos, spirited ensembles and colorful straight-ahead arrangements ... all of the selections are fun and swinging. This is a highly recommended if little-known gem that makes one happy that Clifford Jordan was able to achieve his goal".

Track listing

Personnel
Clifford Jordan – tenor saxophone, bandleader
Joe Gardner, Dean Pratt, Dizzy Reece, Don Sickler – trumpet
Benny Powell – trombone
Kiane Zawadi – trombone, euphonium
Charles Davis, John Jenkins - alto saxophone
Junior Cook, Lou Orenstein, Willie Williams – tenor saxophone
Robert Eldridge – baritone saxophone
Ronnie Mathews – piano
Ed Howard – bass
Tommy Campbell – drums

References

1997 live albums
Clifford Jordan live albums
Mapleshade Records live albums